Acizzia solanicola is a psyllid from Australia, found on plants of the genus Solanum. It has subsequently been found also in New Zealand.

References

External links 

Psyllidae
Hemiptera of Australia
Insects described in 2010